Mong Kok Tsui (Chinese: 芒角嘴 or 旺角嘴) is located in the western portion of present-day Mong Kok.  It is located near where Shantung Street and Nelson Street situate.  

The name of Mong Kok Tsui was gradually eclipsed by Mong Kok, as reflected by Mong Kok Tsui Market which was later renamed Mong Kok Market.

Capes of Hong Kong
Mong Kok